Osage County Poorhouse is a historic poorhouse located near Linn, Osage County, Missouri.  It was built in 1893, and is a 2 1/2-story, "V"-shaped, brick building with Queen Anne and Italianate style design elements.  It has a hipped roof with projecting gable and features original scroll-sawn gable trim, a widow's walk, and a wooden front porch.
It was listed on the National Register of Historic Places in 1998.

References 

Government buildings on the National Register of Historic Places in Missouri
Queen Anne architecture in Missouri
Italianate architecture in Missouri
Government buildings completed in 1893
Buildings and structures in Osage County, Missouri
National Register of Historic Places in Osage County, Missouri